A Poetic Yesterday are a rock band from Redditch, West Midlands formed in 2005. The band consists of Gavin Stewart, Ryan Stewart, Richard Marshall and David Yarnell.

The band has released one studio album ('A Little South of Zero', 2008), a self-released EP ('Lip Rings Covered in Lies', 2006), three music videos ('Serenades For Spiders', 2008, 'The Movie', 2011 and 'Midnightmares' 2012), and have an upcoming second studio album ('Revolutions', 2012).

History

2005-2008: Formation and A Little South of Zero
A Poetic Yesterday formed in Autumn 2005 after the break up of Gavin, Richard and David's previous band Double Standard along with Matt Youl on rhythm guitar. The name 'A Poetic Yesterday' was thought of by a friend while at a jam session with the band and their friends. The band was joined on bass for its first few shows by Steven Williams, a friend of the band who was later replaced by Gavin's brother and current bassist Ryan Stewart. The band recorded their debut EP 'Lip Rings Covered in Lies' in 2006. After gigging around the country for several years the band recorded the songs 'Tony Jaa Will Kick Your Ass' and 'Serenade For Spiders' to be sent to various record labels, eventually resulting in the band signing a one album recording contract with UK-based label Rising Records.

'A Little South of Zero', the band's debut album was released in 2008, followed by more nationwide gigging as well as a music video for 'Serenade For Spiders'. In addition to the album, the band was asked by director Liam Andrew Wright to contribute several songs to the soundtrack of his independent film Ex Cathedra. Matt Youl parted ways with the band later that year, resulting in lead singer Gavin taking on rhythm guitar duties in addition to lead vocals. During this period the band refocused their energies on writing songs more accustomed to the new four-piece lineup.

2008-present: New lineup and Revolutions

For the next two years the band focused on writing new material and gigging in between full-time work commitments. Drummer Dave emailed Ex Cathedra director Liam and mentioned that the band were unsigned and if his company had any projects that they could be involved in, coincidentally at the same time that Liam was thinking of expanding his company Banter Media and starting a record label. This resulted in the band signing a two-album deal with newly formed label Banter Music in December 2010. The band recorded the official theme to the amateur MMA competition Takedown MMA, as well as a music video for it at the Takedown MMA Live 3 event. The band also recorded their second album Revolutions at Banter Studios, with the song 'The Movie' being released as a single, as well as a music video which has also received airplay on Kerrang! TV. The new album was scheduled to be released in January 2012.

Members

Current members
 Gavin Stewart (2005–present) – lead vocals, rhythm guitar
 Ryan Stewart (2005–present) – bass, backing vocals
 Richard Marshall (2005–present) – lead guitar, backing vocals
 David Yarnell (2005–present) – drums
Former members
 Matt Youl (2005–2008) – rhythm guitar
 Steven Williams (2005) – bass

Discography

Studio albums
 A Little South of Zero (Rising Records, 2008)
 Revolutions (Banter Music, 2012)

EPs
 Lip Rings Covered in Lies (self-released, 2006)

Singles
 The Movie (Banter Music, 2011)

Music videos
 Serenades For Spiders (Rising Records, 2008)
 The Movie (Banter Music, 2011)

References

External links 

 
 Record label

English pop punk groups
Musical groups established in 2005